Speed skating at the 1968 Winter Olympics, was held from 4 to 12 February. Eight events were contested at L'Anneau de Vitesse in Grenoble, France.

Medal summary

Medal table

The Netherlands topped the medal table, with nine medals, three of each type. Three tied events meant that only five bronze medals were awarded. The gold medal won by Erhard Keller was the first medal in speedskating for West Germany as a separate country.

Five athletes shared the top of the individual medal table, with one gold and one silver each: Kees Verkerk and Carry Geijssen of the Netherlands, Finland's Kaija Mustonen, the Soviet Union's Lyudmila Titova and Norway's Fred Anton Maier.

Three American female skaters were tied for a silver in the women's 500 meters, all showing the same time.

Men's events

Women's events

Records

One world record and six Olympic records were set at Grenoble. The only Olympic records not broken were in the two shortest events, the men's and women's 500 metres.

Participating NOCs

Nineteen nations competed in the speed skating events at Grenoble. East and West Germany made their debuts as separate teams.

References

 
1968 Winter Olympics events
1968
1968 in speed skating
Olympics, 1968